K. Samarasam is an Indian politician and former Member of the Legislative Assembly of Tamil Nadu. He was elected to the Tamil Nadu legislative assembly from Kaveripattinam constituency as an Anna Dravida Munnetra Kazhagam candidate in 1977, and 1980 elections and as an AIADMK candidate in 1984 election.

References 

 Recipient of Thanthai Periyar Award for 2012 on January 15, 2013 from Jayalalithaa, Chief Minister of Tamil Nadu. The award carries cash reward of Rs. 1 lakh, 8 gram gold medal and a certificate of appreciation.

All India Anna Dravida Munnetra Kazhagam politicians
Living people
Year of birth missing (living people)
Tamil Nadu MLAs 1985–1989